Pelvic tilt is  the orientation of the pelvis in respect to the thighbones and the rest of the body. The pelvis can tilt towards the front, back, or either side of the body.

Anterior pelvic tilt and posterior pelvic tilt are very common abnormalities in regard to the orientation of the pelvis.

Forms
Anterior pelvic tilt is when the front of the pelvis drops in relationship to the back of the pelvis. For example, this happens when the hip flexors shorten and the hip extensors lengthen. It is also called lumbar hyperlordosis.
Posterior pelvic tilt is the opposite, when the front of the pelvis rises and the back of the pelvis drops. For example, this happens when the hip flexors lengthen and the hip extensors shorten, particularly the gluteus maximus which is the primary extensor of the hip.

Lateral pelvic tilt describes tilting toward either right or left and is associated with scoliosis or people who have legs of different length. It can also happen when one leg is bent while the other remains straight, in that case the bent side's hip can follow the femur as knee lowers towards the ground.
Left pelvic tilt is when the right side of the pelvis is elevated higher than the left side.
Right pelvic tilt is when the left side of the pelvis is elevated higher than the right side.

See also
Kyphosis
Lordosis
Scoliosis
Spina bifida

References

Anatomy
Bodyweight exercises
Human anatomy
Pelvis